The women's 4 × 100 metre medley relay event at the 2008 Olympic Games took place on 15 and 17 August at the Beijing National Aquatics Center in Beijing, China.

Dominating the race from the start, the Aussie women's relay team solidified their triumph to destroy the world record and to defend the Olympic title over their American rivals for the second straight time. The foursome of Emily Seebohm (59.33), Leisel Jones (1:04.58), Jessicah Schipper (56.25), and Lisbeth Trickett (52.53) put together a perfect ending with a blazing fast time of 3:52.69 to shave three seconds off their standard from the 2007 FINA World Championships in Melbourne.

Team USA's Natalie Coughlin (58.94), Rebecca Soni (1:05.95), Christine Magnuson (56.14), and legend Dara Torres (52.27) trailed behind their greatest rivals in the pool by six-tenths of a second (0.60), but finished under a world-record time to take home a magnificent silver in a new American standard of 3:53.30. Competing in her fifth Olympics since 1984, at age 41, Torres also picked up her twelfth career medal to match Jenny Thompson's record as the most successful American woman in Olympic history. Delighted by a raucous home crowd inside the Water Cube, the Chinese quartet of Zhao Jing (59.56), Sun Ye (1:06.75), Zhou Yafei (57.40), and Pang Jiaying (52.40) ended on a spectacular fashion with a bronze medal in an Asian record of 3:56.11.

Great Britain's Gemma Spofforth (59.05), Kate Haywood (1:07.51), Jemma Lowe (58.13), and Francesca Halsall (52.81) missed the podium by over a single second, but powered home with a fourth-place effort in a European record of 3:57.50, holding off the Russian foursome of Anastasia Zuyeva (59.16), Yuliya Yefimova (1:06.46), Natalya Sutyagina (58.09), and Anastasia Aksenova (54.13) by 0.34 seconds, a fifth-place time of 3:57.84. Japan's Reiko Nakamura (59.74), Asami Kitagawa (1:07.04), Yuka Kato (58.17), and Haruka Ueda (54.59) cleared a four-minute barrier to claim a sixth spot in 3:59.54, leaving Canada's Julia Wilkinson (1:01.35), Annamay Pierse (1:06.91), Audrey Lacroix (59.01), and Erica Morningstar (54.08) out of the fence in 4:01.35. As the entire field came to a dramatic finish in the pool, Sweden was disqualified from the race because of an early relay takeoff on the final exchange by freestyle anchor Josefin Lillhage.

Records
Prior to this competition, the existing world and Olympic records were as follows.

The following new world and Olympic records were set during this competition.

Results

Heats

Final

References

External links
Official Olympic Report

Women's medley relay 4 x 100 metre
4 × 100 metre medley relay
2008 in women's swimming
Women's events at the 2008 Summer Olympics